Low-Life is the third studio album by English rock band New Order, released on 13 May 1985 by Factory Records. It is considered to be among the band's strongest work, displaying the moment they completed their transformation from post-punk hold-overs to dance-rockers. The album shows New Order's increased incorporation of synthesisers and samplers, while still preserving the rock elements of their earlier work. The original Factory CD issues of the album were mastered with pre-emphasis.

The songs on this album formed the basis of the band's live concert video Pumped Full of Drugs, filmed in Tokyo shortly before the album's release. The music video for "The Perfect Kiss" was directed by Jonathan Demme.

Artwork
The album's artwork is the only New Order release to feature photographs of the band members on its cover; according to designer Peter Saville, the decision to do this was due to him growing tired of his previous "concept covers." To photograph the band, Saville took portraits of them with instant film, which he saw as more versatile than conventional 135 film, stating that "you could push it and do funny things with it. It was very graphic and very dynamic. The grain and the texture made everything look like a movie film." Saville further stated that the band were initially reluctant to depict themselves in the artwork; however, thanks in part to the rapid turnaround of instant film, they grew to enjoy the photoshoot after seeing the results. The album comes packaged with drummer/keyboardist Stephen Morris on the front cover, while inside the case are four photographs and a semi-transparent piece of paper with the band's name, allowing consumers to choose which band member is seen through the sleeve.

Singles and re-releases
The album was preceded by the release of the full-length version of "The Perfect Kiss" as a single (only an edited version appears on the album). John Robie's remix of "Sub-culture" was also released as a 12″ single. Both of these extended versions eventually were included on 1987's Substance.

In 2008, the album was re-released in a Collector's Edition with a bonus disc, including the 17-minute complete version of "Elegia", which was only previously available on a limited edition disc of the 2002 box set Retro and, for the first time in digital format, the unedited 12″ mix of "The Perfect Kiss".

In 2023, the album was re-released as the Definitive Edition, featuring bonus CDs and DVDs with previously unreleased content.

Reception

In a contemporary review of Low-Life for the Los Angeles Times, Richard Cromelin stated that New Order's "varied menu of soul-pop, techno-rock, delicate instrumental moods, and driving, clattering percussion offers adventure in texture at every turn", and that while the album does not contain "anything as transcendent" as "Love Will Tear Us Apart" by New Order's precursor Joy Division, "its confidence and imagination suggest that the possibility is still there." Robert Christgau of The Village Voice noted New Order's attempt to insert some "affect" into its music and wrote that the band "has its heart (or a reasonable facsimile thereof) in the right place, so one doesn't want to quibble." While panning "Love Vigilantes" as "an appallingly naive self-parody", Steve Sutherland of Melody Maker found that the remainder of the album "boasts the most articulate sound since The Cocteaus' Treasure, elevating depression to ecstasy."

John Bush of AllMusic wrote that Low-Life was "in every way, the artistic equal" of New Order's previous album Power, Corruption & Lies, as well as "the point where the band's fusion of rock and electronics became seamless". The A.V. Clubs Josh Modell similarly noted that the album "completely locked the disco influences into sync with New Order's pop leanings". David Quantick, writing in Uncut, felt that Low-Life was "the first New Order album that sounds like an album", with Bernard Sumner's "most human lyrics" complementing Gillian Gilbert and Stephen Morris' "pop axis" and Peter Hook's "breath-taking" bass performances. In 2000, Q magazine placed Low-Life at number 97 on its list of the "100 Greatest British Albums Ever". Low-Life was included in the book 1001 Albums You Must Hear Before You Die.

Track listing

Personnel
Credits adapted from the liner notes of Low-Life.

 New Order – production
 Michael Johnson – engineering
 Mark, Penny and Tim – tape operators
 Trevor Key – photography
 Peter Saville Associates – design

Charts

Certifications

Release history
 UK LP – Factory Records (FACT 100)
 UK CD – Factory Records (FACD 100)
 UK cassette – Factory Records (FACT 100C)
 US LP – Qwest Records (25289-1)
 US cassette – Qwest Records (9 25289-4)
 UK CD (1993 re-release) – London Records (520 020-2)

References

External links

1985 albums
Factory Records albums
New Order (band) albums